Atwood is an unincorporated community in Kenton County, Kentucky, United States. The community is located on Kentucky Route 17 south of Nicholson.

The community has the name of Atwood C. Bird (1867-1960), a local banker and farmer.

References

Unincorporated communities in Kenton County, Kentucky
Unincorporated communities in Kentucky